The Citroën Ami is a two-passenger electric quadricycle marketed by the French manufacturer Citroën, produced from 2020 and marketed from June 2020. The vehicle has been developed by Capgemini as a turnkey program.

It was announced in 2019 as the concept car Ami One. It is named after the original Citroën Ami, which was marketed from 1961 to 1978.

Overview 
The Citroën Ami was unveiled on 27 February 2020 at Paris La Défense Arena and marketed from June 2020 in a unique "Ami Blue" body color (blue-gray) customizable with stickers. To reduce its price, it is produced in Morocco in the PSA factory in Kenitra.

It is a light motor quadricycle which can be driven in France without a license by people born before 1988 or by those older than 14 who have an AM license (EEA name)–formerly Road Safety Certificate (BSR) (national name).

The Ami can be used for carsharing in the Free2Move network of Groupe PSA, rented or purchased, on the internet or in stores Fnac and Darty with which Citroën has concluded a partnership for the exhibition, sale or rental of the vehicle from 30 March 2020. The vehicle can be picked up at a store, a Citroën dealership or delivered at home.

In June 2022, Citroën launched the My Ami Buggy, a limited edition inspired by the My Ami Buggy concept.

Opel Rocks-e

In August 2021, Opel presented the Opel Rocks-e, an identical version of the vehicle for Germany only. It went on sale in November 2021. From 2023, it was renamed Opel Rocks Electric, in line with Opel's phasing out of the "-e" suffix on electric models.

The Opel Rocks Electric is offered on the Dutch market as well.

Technical characteristics 
To save costs, the body is completely symmetrical; not only left-right symmetrical, but also front-rear symmetrical, except for the doors and the roof. The doors open in opposite directions, with the driver having a suicide door while the passenger door opens conventionally, allowing the same panels to be used.  There are no other doors, making the storage spaces accessible only from the two side doors. All versions are left-hand drive, even those intended for use in the otherwise right-hand drive UK.

The quadricycle is equipped with a 6 kW electric motor operating at 48 V. It accepts a lithium-ion battery with a capacity of 5.5 kWh, rechargeable to 80% in three hours on a 230 V household outlet, giving it a maximum range of  WMTC.

Gallery

Notes

References 

Ami
Cars introduced in 2020
Microcars
Quadricycles
Electric city cars